Marcel Esdras (21 May 1927 in Pointe-Noire, Guadeloupe – 13 November 1988 in Clichy-la-Garenne, France) was a politician from Guadeloupe who served in the French National Assembly from 1981-1986 representing Union pour la démocratie française. He also served as the President of the Regional Council of Guadeloupe from 1981 until 1982.

References
Marcel Esdras page on the French National Assembly website

1927 births
1988 deaths
People from Pointe-Noire, Guadeloupe
Union for French Democracy politicians
Deputies of the 7th National Assembly of the French Fifth Republic
Presidents of the Regional Council of Guadeloupe